Leonid Borisovich Metalnikov (born April 24, 1990) is a Kazakhstani professional ice hockey defenceman who currently plays for Admiral Vladivostok of the Kontinental Hockey League (KHL).

References

External links

1990 births
Living people
Admiral Vladivostok players
Barys Nur-Sultan players
Gornyak Rudny players
Sportspeople from Oskemen
Kazakhstani ice hockey defencemen
Kazzinc-Torpedo players
Nomad Astana players
Yertis Pavlodar players
Saryarka Karagandy players
Universiade medalists in ice hockey
Universiade silver medalists for Kazakhstan
Yuzhny Ural Orsk players
Competitors at the 2013 Winter Universiade